Pichon is a surname, and may refer to;

Édouard Pichon, French grammarian and psychoanalyst
 Fats Pichon, an American jazz musician
 Jean-Louis Pichon, a French stage director
 Laurent Pichon, a French football player
 Liz Pichon (born 1963), British illustrator and children's writer
 Marcel Pichon (1921–1954), a French botanist
 Marinette Pichon, a French football player
 Mickaël Pichon, a French motorcross racer
 Stephen Pichon, a French politician and minister of foreign affairs during the Paris Peace Conference
 Xavier Le Pichon, a French geophysicist
 Louis Andre Pichon, a French diplomat
Raphaël Pichon a countertenor, choral conductor and conductor
Pichon, fictional author of the fictional anatomy textbook La Beauté Humaine in Vladimir Nabokov's novel Lolita.

Other:
Pichon Longueville, archaic Bordeaux wine estate, presently:
Château Pichon Longueville Baron, or Pichon Baron
Château Pichon Longueville Comtesse de Lalande, or Pichon Comtesse, or Pichon Lalande

Breton-language surnames